Women form 57% of the membership of the Opus Dei prelature. The role of women in Opus Dei has sometimes been a source of criticism for the organization.

Segregation of men and women
Some of these gender-related criticisms have been directed specifically towards Opus Dei.  Unmarried male and female numeraries are segregated, with only limited contact between genders—male and female numeraries live in separate centers and attend separate classes and retreats.  Some have said that Opus Dei's U.S. Headquarters even has separate entrances for men and women, but this is not so: there are separate entrances to the men's house and to the women's house, but men and women can enter either house through the appropriate entrance. Similarly, in Opus Dei, there is a sub-group of female numeraries known as "assistants" who perform the cooking, cleaning, sewing, and other household as their professional work and a way to serve the others.

Escriva's teachings on women
Members emphasize that the numerary assistants clean both men's and women's centers, but critics take issue with the fact that while women clean for men, men never clean for the women. Critics also object to some of Escriva's teachings on women.  He once wrote, "Wives, you should ask yourself whether you are not forgetting a little about your appearance. Your duty is, and will always be, to take as good care of your appearance as you did before you were married—and it is a duty of justice." Escriva similarly stated that "Women needn’t be scholars—it’s enough for them to be prudent."

Men and women regarded as equals
Opus Dei and its supporters reject any suggestion their policies are inappropriate.  While they admit women are sometimes treated differently than men within Opus Dei, supporters emphasize that men and women are nonetheless regarded as equals.  A spokesman has said the Opus Dei is committed to the "equal dignity of men and women."   In the opinion of one member, women should not enter the workforce as "one more" but as a "different one," given that "the only ontological difference among human beings is determined by the sexes," and that care for the family and the home are "eminently feminine."  Supporters say that Opus Dei, with its emphasis on work, is a strong advocate of women becoming professionals—according to one scholar, "Opus Dei has an enviable record of educating the poor and supporting women, whether single or married, in any occupation they choose."

Women in the governance of Opus Dei
Supporters also point out that women participate in the governance of Opus Dei—for example, the Central Advisory, which oversees the women's branch of Opus Dei, is made up entirely of women. Thus, John Allen reports that half of the leadership positions in Opus Dei are held by women, and they supervise men.

Similar criticisms directed at Catholicism as a whole
Many of these criticisms are directed not just at Opus Dei, but at Catholicism as a whole. As in the rest of the Catholic Church, women may not join the priesthood or participate in the very highest levels of church governance. The Catholic prohibitions against abortion and birth control have also drawn criticism. While a minority of Roman Catholics have advocated for changing these stances, Opus Dei is generally seen as supportive of them.

Traditionalist approach to women
Many critics of such policies have therefore opposed Opus Dei, as in the case of one author who views Opus Dei "as one of the most reactionary organizations in the Roman Catholic Church today...for its devotion to promoting, as public policy, the Vatican's inflexibly traditionalist approach to women, and reproductive health."  Those who approve of the Vatican's policies, meanwhile, applaud Opus Dei's stance on those issues.

References

Bibliography
Women of Opus Dei: In Their Own Words by MT Oates, Linda Ruf and Jane Driver, MD

Opus Dei
Catholicism and women